Jānis Lanka (born 3 August 1940) is a Latvian athlete. He competed in the men's decathlon at the 1968 Summer Olympics, representing the Soviet Union.

References

1940 births
Living people
Athletes (track and field) at the 1968 Summer Olympics
Latvian decathletes
Olympic athletes of the Soviet Union
Sportspeople from Liepāja